Ludendorff is a surname. Notable persons with that name include:

 Erich Ludendorff (1865–1937), German general
 Hans Ludendorff (1873–1941), German astronomer
 Mathilde Ludendorff (1877–1966), German teacher and psychiatrist

See also
 Ludendorff Bridge, a former railway bridge across the Rhine in Germany, named after Erich Ludendorff
 Ludendorff, the former German name of the Prussian village Kruszewnia, now in Poland

German-language surnames